The 1971 La Flèche Wallonne was the 35th edition of La Flèche Wallonne cycle race and was held on 22 April 1971. The race started in Liège and finished in Marcinelle. The race was won by Roger De Vlaeminck of the Flandria team.

General classification

References

1971 in road cycling
1971
1971 in Belgian sport